Miro Ćosić (born 9 September 1983) is a Bosnian biathlete. He competed in the men's 20 km individual event at the 2006 Winter Olympics.

References

External links
 

1983 births
Living people
Bosnia and Herzegovina male biathletes
Olympic biathletes of Bosnia and Herzegovina
Biathletes at the 2006 Winter Olympics
Sportspeople from Sarajevo
Serbs of Bosnia and Herzegovina